Chief judge may refer to:

In lower or circuit courts
The highest-ranking or most senior member of a lower court or circuit court with more than one judge. 
 Chief judge (Australia)
 Chief judge (United States)

In supreme courts

Some of Chief justice positions around supreme courts of world are translated as 'Chief judge'' as following.
 Chief Judge of Abia State
 Chief Judge of the High Court of Hong Kong
 Chief Judge of Kaduna State
 Chief Judge of Lagos State
 Chief Judge of Rivers State
 Chief Judge of Sabah and Sarawak

See also
 Lower court
 Supreme court
 Chief justice